Hydropus is a genus of fungi in the family Marasmiaceae. The widespread genus contains about 100 species, especially in tropical areas, but is not well represented in temperate regions. About 15 taxa are found in Europe; H. floccipus has the widest distribution in western Europe. Hydropus was circumscribed by Rolf Singer in 1948. Species in the genus have fruit bodies with caps that are mycenoid, collybioid, or omphaloid in form. Most species occur in tropical and subtropical regions, where they grow as saprobes on rotting wood, forest litter, and mosses. Generally, most Hydropus species are rare, and several  are known only from the type collection, including H. conicus, H. moserianus, H. nitens, and H. paradoxus.

Species

See also

List of Marasmiaceae genera

References

External links

Marasmiaceae
Agaricales genera
Taxa named by Rolf Singer